Staggers is a surname. Notable people with the surname include:

Harley Orrin Staggers (1907–1991), politician from the U.S. state of West Virginia and namesake of the Staggers Rail Act of 1980
Harley O. Staggers, Jr. (born 1951), politician from the U.S. state of West Virginia
Jon Staggers (born 1948), American football player
Kermit Staggers (1947-2019), American politicians
Margaret Anne Staggers (born 1945), politician from the U.S. state of West Virginia
Noelle Staggers, contestant on America's Next Top Model, Cycle 4, TV series

Surnames
Surnames of British Isles origin
English-language surnames